David Reidy may refer to:
 David Reidy (Clare hurler) (born 1995), Irish hurler
 David Reidy (Limerick hurler) (born 1993), Irish hurler
 David Reidy (professor) (born 1962), American philosopher and professor at University of Tennessee